The discography of Brian Cadd, an Australian singer-songwriter, who had four Australian Top 20 singles and three Top 20 albums in the early 1970s. Cadd was also the lead singer of bands such as The Groop, Axiom, The Flying Burrito Brothers and The Blazing Salads.
On 18 July 2007, the Australian Recording Industry Association (ARIA) recognised Cadd's iconic status when he was inducted into the ARIA Hall of Fame.

Albums

Studio and live albums

Compilation albums

Extended plays

Singles

References

External links

Official website

Discographies of Australian artists
Pop music discographies
Rock music discographies
Rhythm and blues discographies